

National leagues

Primera División

Apertura champion: Defensor Sporting (4th title)
Top scorer: Santiago García (15 goals)
Clausura champion: Nacional (6th title)
Top scorer: Cristian Palacios (15 goals)
Overall champion: Nacional (43rd title)
Top scorer: Santiago García (23 goals)
International qualifiers:
Copa Libertadores:
Group Stage: Nacional and Defensor Sporting
Preliminary Round: Peñarol
Copa Sudamericana:
Second Stage: Nacional
First Stage: Fénix and Bella Vista
Relegated: Central Español, Tacuarembó and Miramar Misiones
Source: RSSSF

Second Division
Segunda División champion: Rentistas (4th title)
Segunda División runners-up: Cerrito
Top scorers: Santiago Bello and Joel Burgueño (13 goals)

Promotion play-offs

Promoted teams
Rentistas
Cerrito
Cerro Largo
Source: RSSSF

Clubs in international competitions

Defensor Sporting
2010 Copa Sudamericana

Defensor Sporting eliminated on goal difference 3–4.

Liverpool
2011 Copa Libertadores

Liverpool eliminated on points 1–4.

Nacional
2011 Copa Libertadores

Nacional eliminated by finishing in 3rd place in their group.

Peñarol
2010 Copa Sudamericana

Peñarol eliminated on away goals.

2011 Copa Libertadores

Peñarol defeated by Santos on points 1–4.

River Plate
2010 Copa Sudamericana

River Plate eliminated on away goals.

National teams

Senior team
This section covers Uruguay's senior team matches from the end of the 2010 FIFA World Cup until the end of the 2011 Copa América.

Friendly matches

Copa Confraternidad de Antel

Copa 100 Años del Banco de Seguros del Estado

Copa América

Uruguay U-20

Friendly matches

Copa Integración Latinoamericana

Copa Alcaldía de Medellín

Copa Aerosur

100 Años de la Camiseta Celeste trophy

Suwon Cup

Qualifiers for Olympic Games and World Cup

Uruguay U-17

Friendly matches

Torneo Internacional de la Universidad Católica

Qualifiers for Pan American Games and World Cup

World Cup

Uruguay U-16

Friendly matches

Montaigu Tournament

Uruguay U-15

Friendly matches

Torneo Internacional Juvenil Tahuichi Aguilera

References

External links
AUF
Uruguay on FIFA.com

 
Seasons in Uruguayan football